Jiangsu Broadcasting Corporation (JSBC) is China's third biggest television network after China Central Television (CCTV) and Hunan Broadcasting System (HBS). The television network is owned by the Jiangsu provincial government. The network is based in Nanjing in Jiangsu.

History
Before the establishment of Jiangsu Broadcasting Corporation, the local television stations first aired in Nanjing and southern Jiangsu in October 1952. JSBC was established in June 2001 to compete with other major Television networks and expanded its network through nationwide satellite television in January 1997.

Television channels
 Jiangsu Television
 JSBC City Channel
 JSBC Arts Channel
 JSBC Films and Series Channel
 JSBC Sports and Leisure Channel
 JSBC Public and News Channel
 Youman Cartoon
 JSBC International Channel
 Haoxiang Shopping Channel
 JSBC Educational Channel
 JSBC Learning Channel
 JSBC Adornments Channel (pay channel)
 Fortune Land Channel (pay channel)
 Jiangsu Mobile Channel
 nowJelli (cooperation channel between JSBC and Hong Kong now TV)

Former television 

 Jiangsu Preschool Channel (pay channel, stopped airing on January 6, 2016)
 English Learning Channel (pay channel, stopped airing in 2010)

Programming
JSBC has broadcast notable programming such as If You Are the One, often referred to as the Chinese version of the Australian dating game show Taken Out.

 Celebrity Battle
 If You Are the One
 Fei De Will Watch
 Kunlun Fight
 Raid the Cage
 Who's Still Standing?
 Win in China
 The Brain
 King of Mask Singer
 Mask Singer
 Masked Dancing King
 Dating with the Parents

See also
Zhi Lai Zhi Wang (2010)

References

External links

Television networks in China
Television channels and stations established in 1997
Mass media in Nanjing